The Dubuque class gunboats were a class of gunboats built by the United States prior to World War I. The class was designed in 1903. The United States Navy commissioned 2 Dubuque-class gunboats in 1903. Dubuques had a design speed of 12 knots, and a main  armament of six 4" rapid-fire guns and four 6-pounder rapid-fire guns in single mounts.

Design
The hull was of composite construction, with steel above the waterline and wood below. Two tall and thin funnels were fitted.

Ships

References

External links

Ships built in Morris Heights, Bronx
World War I patrol vessels of the United States
World War II patrol vessels of the United States
1905 ships